Milyeringa justitia, commonly known as the Barrow cave gudgeon, is a species of fish in the family Milyeringidae endemic to groundwater systems (aquifers) of Barrow Island, around 50 km off the Pilbara coast in Western Australia. This troglobitic species has a pale body, lacking in pigment, and it is eyeless and blind, using sensory papillae located on the head and body to allow it to feed and move around in total darkness. The specific name justitia is Latin for "justice" and was given by the describers to complement the specific name of Milyeringa veritas which means "truth" in the hope that “As truth and justice are supposed to go together, we name this species justitia, from the Latin for justice, in the hope that justice helps the species to survive on Barrow Island, which has been an oilfield since 1967 and is most recently the site of the Gorgon Gas Hub development.”  Very little is known about M. justitia as between 2002 and 2013 only six specimens were collected but its biology is assumed to be similar to that of M. veritas.

References

justitia
Fish described in 2013
Taxa named by Helen K. Larson
Taxa named by Ralph Foster
Cave fish